Fred Morris Dearing (November 19, 1879 – June 1963) was a United States diplomat.

Biography 

Fred Morris Dearing was born in Columbia, Missouri on November 19, 1879. He was a graduate of the University of Missouri.  

He was a career officer in the United States Foreign Service.  In the administration of President of the United States Warren G. Harding, Dearing was United States Assistant Secretary of State under United States Secretary of State Charles Evans Hughes from March 11, 1921 to February 28, 1922.  He served as U.S. Minister to Portugal from June 6, 1922 to February 28, 1930.  He was U.S. Minister to Peru from May 23, 1930 to June 3, 1937.  He was U.S. Minister to Sweden from April 22, 1937 to September 23, 1937.

Dearing died in 1963.

References

External links

Profile from Political Graveyard

1879 births
1963 deaths
United States Assistant Secretaries of State
University of Missouri alumni
Ambassadors of the United States to Portugal
Ambassadors of the United States to Peru
Ambassadors of the United States to Sweden
United States Foreign Service personnel
People from Columbia, Missouri
Burials at Columbia Cemetery (Columbia, Missouri)